Yubileyny was a town in Moscow Oblast, Russia, located  northeast of the Moscow Ring Road by Yaroslavl Highway, on the Klyazma River. It was merged into the surrounding city of Korolyov effective June 2014. Population:

History
The town developed in an area where several villages stood in the past. Most of the town lands belonged to the Sheremetyevs, who bequeathed it to the Odoyevskys. The first mention of Bolshevo as a place that belonged to the Odoyevskys dates back to 1585. Another village whose territory partially overlapped with the town limits was Maksimkovo, which was first mentioned in 1618 as the property of the Lvovs family. Finally, the village of Lapino-Spasskoye, owned by boyar M. Godunov, was first mentioned in 1617.

In the 19th century, two railway lines were built in this region. These lines still exist and defined the southern and the eastern boundaries of the town before its abolition.

In September 1939, Moscow Military Engineering College was opened in Bolshevo. In 1946, the college was moved to Leningrad, and 4th Scientific Research Institute of the Ministry of Defense of the USSR was opened instead. The institute played an important role in developing the Soviet rocket and space technology. In 1972, 50th Tikhonravov Central Scientific Research of the Aerospace Forces opened here.

In the 1950s–1960s, two closed military communities were formed in this area. The communities grew and developed a limited civil infrastructure. By 1970, a third military community was established, and the civil infrastructure developed and improved. On November 24, 1972, a closed work settlement of Bolshevo-1, serving the troop unit #25840, was established.

In 1989, Bolshevo-1 was opened up, and on May 25, 1992, it was granted town status and renamed Yubileyny. Former military communities became residential microdistricts.

As Yubileyny grew, the nearby city of Korolyov also developed dynamically. Ultimately, with an exception of a  segment of a border with the Yaroslavl Highway, Yubileyny became completely surrounded by the territory of Korolyov. This segment constituted the northern border of a ribbon-shaped area of land that was annexed by the town with the sole purpose of establishing a border with an entity other than Korolyov. Nevertheless, effective June 2014, Yubileyny was merged into Korolyov and ceased to exist as a separate town.

Administrative and municipal status
Within the framework of administrative divisions, it was incorporated as Yubileyny Town Under Oblast Jurisdiction—an administrative unit with the status equal to that of the districts. As a municipal division, Yubileyny Town Under Oblast Jurisdiction was incorporated as Yubileyny Urban Okrug.

References

Notes

Sources

Former populated places in Moscow Oblast
Defunct towns in Russia
Naukograds
2014 disestablishments in Russia
Populated places disestablished in 2014